Levi ibn Habib (c. 1480 – c. 1545), also known by the acronym HaRaLBaCh, was Chief Rabbi of Jerusalem from 1525 until his death.

Under King Manuel of Portugal, and when about seventeen, he was compelled to submit to baptism, but at the first opportunity fled to Salonica, where he could follow the dictates of his conscience in safety. In 1523 he went to Jerusalem, but in a short time returned to Salonica. In 1525 he settled permanently in Jerusalem, where his learning won him the position of chief rabbi. There he met Jacob Berab, with whom he often came into conflict on questions of rabbinical law. A serious quarrel broke out between these two rabbis when Berab, becoming chief rabbi of Safed, reintroduced the ancient practice of the ordination of rabbis. They carried on a bitter and envenomed controversy for some time, in the course of which Berab referred to Ibn Habib's adoption of Christianity. The latter frankly admitted the fact, but pointed out that at the time he was a mere youth, that his involuntary profession of Christianity lasted hardly a year, and that he took the first opportunity to escape and rejoin the religion of his fathers. This controversy was chiefly responsible for the fact that the practice of ordination ceased again soon after Berab's death.

Writings
He was knowledgeable in mathematics and astronomy. In his youth he edited his father's book Ein Yaakov (Constantinople, 1516; by Jacob ibn Habib). He wrote: She'elot u-Teshubot, a collection of 147 responsa; Kontres ha-Semikah, a treatise on ordination; Perush Kiddush HaChodesh, a commentary on Hilchot Kiddush HaChodesh (rules governing the construction of the Hebrew calendar in Maimonides' code of law). All these works were published together in Venice (1565); the last-named work was also published separately (ib. 1574-76).

References

 Its bibliography:
David Conforte, Kore ha-Dorot, pp. 32a, 33b, 37a:
Heinrich Grätz, Gesch. 3d ed., ix.293-296;
Giovanni Bernardo De Rossi, Dizionario, i.84;
Hazan, Ha-Ma'alot li-Shelomoh, pp. 53a-54a;
Julius Fürst, Bibl. Jud. i.153;
Moritz Steinschneider, Cat. Bodl. col. 1606.

16th-century rabbis from the Ottoman Empire
15th-century Portuguese Jews
Sephardi rabbis in Ottoman Syria
1480s births
1540s deaths
Year of birth uncertain
Year of death uncertain
Chief rabbis of Jerusalem
People from Zamora, Spain
Jews expelled from Spain in 1492
Authors of books on Jewish law
Sephardi rabbis in Ottoman Palestine